Ella Suitiala (born 1 October 1989 in Espoo) is a Finnish snowboarder, specializing in halfpipe.

Suitiala competed at the 2014 Winter Olympics for Finland. In the halfpipe, she finished 19th in the qualifying round, failing to advance.

Suitiala made her World Cup debut in December 2011. As of September 2014, she has one podium finish, winning a bronze medal at Ruka in 2011–12. Her best overall finish is 11th, in 2011–12.

World Cup Podiums

References

1989 births
Living people
Olympic snowboarders of Finland
Snowboarders at the 2014 Winter Olympics
Sportspeople from Espoo
Finnish female snowboarders